Indigène éditions is an independent publishing house located in Montpellier, France. Founded in 1996 by the author Jean-Pierre Barou and his partner, the author Sylvie Crossman, the company aims to create a non-hierarchical dialogue between the arts and other subjects. Indigène éditions was subject to significant media attention after the publication of Indignez-vous! by the diplomat and ex-French Resistance fighter Stéphane Hessel.

Jean-Pierre Barou

Jean-Pierre Barou took his initial steps into the cultural sector as an editor of the French newspaper La Cause du people, where he worked with the philosopher Jean-Paul Sartre. He later became an editor at Le Seuil, a French publisher, which is where he met Crossman. They moved to Australia together in 1985 with their son, Benjamin. They now have a daughter together as well. The couple lived in Switzerland for 2 years before settling back in France where they founded Indigène éditions.

History of the company
The company was founded in 1996 by Barou and his partner, the author Sylvie Crossman. Running the company from their home in Montpellier, they aim to create a non-hierarchical dialogue between the arts and other subjects.

Indigène éditions was brought to public attention after the publication of Indignez-vous! by the diplomat and ex-French Resistance fighter Stéphane Hessel in 2010. The book was a commercial success and became a bestseller in France (where it sold 2 million copies), Germany, Italy, and Spain. It has been translated into several languages, including Italian, Portuguese, and Greek. Indignez-vous! was translated into English for US publication in 2011 as Time for Outrage.

Publications 

 Indignez-vous! by Stéphane Hessel, October 2010
 L'argent danse pour toi by Karl Marx, November 2010

 Je suis prof et je désobéis by Bastien Cazals, April 2009,
 Réflexions sur le fascisme économique by John Berger, March 2009
 L'Art de vivre au maximum avec le minimum by Jean-Roger Geyer, November 2009,
 Camus et sa critique libertaire de la violence by Lou Marin, February 2010
 Sartre et la violence des opprimés by Yves K., February 2010
 Rooms, Tsiganes, Voyageurs: l'éternité et après? by Claire Auzias, March 2010
 Tunisian girl, la blogueuse de la révolution by Lina Ben Mhenni, June 2011

 Place de la République pour une spiritualité laïque by Abd Al Malik, February 2015

References 

French companies established in 1996
Publishing companies of France